Rusiec may refer to the following places:
Rusiec, Greater Poland Voivodeship (west-central Poland)
Rusiec, Łódź Voivodeship (central Poland)
Rusiec, Masovian Voivodeship (east-central Poland)